Clarence Park may refer to:

 Clarence Park (St Albans), a public park in St Albans in which the St Albans City F.C. football stadium is located
 Clarence Park (album), an album by IDM musician Chris Clark named after the park in St Albans
 Clarence Park, Bury, Greater Manchester, England
 Clarence Park, South Australia, a suburb of Adelaide, Australia and part of the electoral district of Ashford
 Clarence Park, Weston-super-Mare, public park in Somerset town formerly used as first-class cricket venue